All for Nothing / Nothing for All is a two-disc compilation album by The Replacements. The All for Nothing disc contains tracks from Tim through All Shook Down, while the Nothing for All disc is a collection of B-sides and other previously unreleased tracks.

Track listing

Disc one: All for Nothing

Disc two: Nothing for All

References

The Replacements (band) compilation albums
1997 compilation albums
B-side compilation albums
Reprise Records compilation albums
Albums produced by Tommy Ramone
Albums produced by Matt Wallace
Albums produced by Jim Dickinson
Albums produced by Scott Litt